is a Japanese mixed martial artist who competes in the flyweight (114 lbs) division of Shooto. He is a four-time Shooto World Flyweight (114lbs) Championship title challenger and the former Shooto Flyweight (114 lbs) champion. He's recognized as the seventh greatest strawweight in the history of the sport by Fight Matrix.

Mixed martial arts career

Early career
Ito made his professional debut against Takahisa Toyoshima at Shooto: Back To Our Roots 4 on July 15, 2007, and won by a 53-second technical knockout. He amassed an 8-2 record over the next three years, during which he finished as a runner-up in the 2008 Shooto Rookie Tournament.

Shooto

Consecutive title fights
Ito was scheduled to fight Junji Ikoma for the vacant Shooto World Flyweight Championship at Shooto: Shooto Tradition 2011 on April 29, 2011. Ito was at the time the #1 ranked flyweight contender in the Shooto rankings, while Ikoma came in as the #4 ranked flyweight contender. Ikoma won the fight by unanimous decision, with all three judges awarding him a 29-28 scorecard.

Ito was scheduled to face the #8 ranked Shooto flyweight contender Yuki Shoujou in the co-main event of Shooto: 3rd Round on March 10, 2012. He won the fight by majority decision.

Ito was scheduled to challenge for the Shooto World Flyweight Championship, for the second time in his career, against Mikihito Yamagami at Shooto: 10th Round on September 30, 2012. He lost the fight by a second-round technical submission, losing consciousness due to a rear-naked choke at the 1:36 minute mark.

Ito was scheduled to face Tadaaki Yamamoto at Shooto: Gig Tokyo 15 on August 25, 2013. He won the fight by unanimous decision.

Ito made his third career Shooto World Flyweight title challenge against Shinya Murofushi at Shooto: 1st Round 2014 on January 13, 2014. He lost the fight by a first-round technical submission. Murofushi managed to take Ito down, take his back and lock in a figure four lock, before choking him unconscious with an RNC at the 3:33 minute mark.

Fourth Shooto title run
Ito was scheduled to face Hiroaki Shishino at Shooto: 7th Round 2014 on September 27, 2014. He won the fight by a first-round knockout.

Ito was scheduled to face the 33-fight veteran Kenichi Sawada at Shooto: Gig Tokyo 18 on February 11, 2015. He won the fight by a second-round knockout.

Ito was scheduled to face the undefeated Ryohei Kurosawa at Shooto: Mobstyles 15th Anniversary Tour Fight & Mosh on May 3, 2015. He won the fight by a second-round knockout.

Ito was scheduled to challenge Yoshitaka Naito for the Shooto World Flyweight title at Shooto - Professional Shooto 11/29 on November 29, 2015. He lost the fight by unanimous decision.

Fifth Shooto title run
Ito had his first overseas fight at World Series of Fighting Global Championship: Japan 1 on February 7, 2016, when he was scheduled to face Jarred Brooks. Brooks won the fight by a second-round knockout.

Ito then returned to the Japanese circuit, and was scheduled to face Takahiro Kohori at Shooto - Professional Shooto 11/12 on November 12, 2016. He won the fight by a first-round technical knockout.

Ito fought the future Shooto Flyweight champion Yosuke Saruta at Shooto - Professional Shooto 1/29 on January 29, 2017. The fight was ruled a majority draw.

Ito was scheduled to fight Itchaku Murata at Shooto - Professional Shooto 1/28 on January 28, 2018. He lost the fight by a first-round knockout.

Ito was scheduled to fight Mijikai Nagai at Shooto - Professional Shooto 5/13 on May 13, 2018. He won the fight by unanimous decision.

Ito was scheduled to face Ryosuke Honda at Shooto - Professional Shooto 11/17 on November 17, 2018. He won the fight by a second-round technical decision, as Ito was unable to continue fighting following a low blow 17 seconds into the round.

Ito was scheduled to face Michael Nakagawa at Shooto - 30th Anniversary Tour 7th Round on September 22, 2019. The fight was ruled a split draw.

Ito was scheduled to fight Jerome Wanawan at Shooto 2020 in Korakuen Hall on January 26, 2020. He won the fight by unanimous decision.

Ito was scheduled to face Tateo Iino at Professional Shooto 2020 Vol. 6 on September 19, 2020. He won the fight by a first-round technical knockout, stopping Iino with six seconds left in the round.

Shooto Flyweight champion
Ito was booked to face Ryohei Kurosawa for the interim Shooto Flyweight Championship at Professional Shooto 2021 vol. 7 on November 7, 2021. Ito and Kurosawa previously fought on May 3, 2015, when Ito handed Kurosawa his sole professional loss. Ito won the rematch by a first-round submission.

On August 1, 2022, it was announced that the previous Shooto flyweight champion Hiroba Minowa had vacated the title. As such, Ito was promoted to undisputed champion status. Ito faced Jo Arai in his first title defense at Professional Shooto 2022 vol. 6 on September 19, 2022. He lost the fight by a first-round knockout.

Championships and accomplishments
Shooto
Shooto Flyweight (114 lbs) Championship
Interim Shooto Flyweight (114 lbs) Championship
2008 Shooto Rookie Tournament Runner-up

Mixed martial arts record

|-
| Loss
| align=center|19–9–2
| Jo Arai
| TKO (punch)
| Shooto 2022 Vol.6
| 
| align=center|1
| align=center|1:50
| Tokyo, Japan
| 
|-
| Win
| align=center| 19–8–2
| Ryohei Kurosawa
| Submission (rear-naked choke)
| Shooto 2021 Vol.7
| 
| align=center| 1
| align=center| 3:23
| Tokyo, Japan
| 
|-
| Win
| align=center| 18–8–2
| Tateo Iino
| TKO (punches)
| Shooto 2020 Vol. 6
| 
| align=center| 1
| align=center| 4:54
| Tokyo, Japan
| 
|-
| Win
| align=center| 17–8–2
| Jerome Wanawan
| Decision (unanimous)
| Shooto 2020 in Korakuen Hall
| 
| align=center| 3
| align=center| 5:00
| Tokyo, Japan
| 
|-
| Draw
| align=center| 16–8–2
| Michael Nakagawa
| Draw (split)
| Shooto - 30th Anniversary Tour 7th Round
| 
| align=center| 3
| align=center| 5:00
| Tokyo, Japan
| 
|-
| Loss
| align=center| 16–8–1
| Ryosuke Honda
| Technical Decision (unanimous)
| Shooto - Professional Shooto 11/17
| 
| align=center| 2
| align=center| 0:17
| Tokyo, Japan
| 
|-
| Loss
| align=center| 15–8–1
| Mijikai Nagai
| Decision (unanimous)
| Shooto - Professional Shooto 5/13
| 
| align=center| 2
| align=center| 5:00
| Tokyo, Japan
| 
|-
| Loss
| align=center| 15–7–1
| Itchaku Murata
| KO (punch)
| Shooto - Professional Shooto 1/28
| 
| align=center| 1
| align=center| 0:53
| Tokyo, Japan
| 
|-
| Draw
| align=center| 
| Yosuke Saruta
| Draw (majority)
| Shooto - Professional Shooto 1/29
| 
| align=center| 3
| align=center| 5:00
| Tokyo, Japan
| 
|-
| Win
| align=center| 14–7
| Takahiro Kohori
| TKO (punches)
| Shooto - Professional Shooto 11/12
| 
| align=center| 1
| align=center| 2:07
| Tokyo, Japan
| 
|-
| Loss
| align=center| 13–7
| Jarred Brooks
| KO (elbows)
| World Series of Fighting Global Championship: Japan 1
| 
| align=center| 2
| align=center| 3:29
| Tokyo, Japan
| 
|-
| Loss
| align=center| 13–6
| Yoshitaka Naito
| Decision (unanimous)
| Shooto - Professional Shooto 11/29
| 
| align=center| 5
| align=center| 5:00
| Tokyo, Japan
| 
|-
| Win
| align=center| 13–5
| Ryohei Kurosawa
| KO (punch)
| Shooto: Mobstyles 15th Anniversary Tour Fight & Mosh
| 
| align=center| 1
| align=center| 2:00
| Tokyo, Japan
| 
|-
| Win
| align=center| 12–5
| Kenichi Sawada
| KO (punches)
| Shooto: Gig Tokyo 18
| 
| align=center| 2
| align=center| 2:04
| Tokyo, Japan
| 
|-
| Win
| align=center| 11–5
| Hiroaki Shishino
| KO (punches)
| Shooto: 7th Round 2014
| 
| align=center| 1
| align=center| 1:52
| Tokyo, Japan
| 
|-
| Loss
| align=center| 10–5
| Shinya Murofushi
| Technical Submission (rear-naked choke)
| Shooto: 1st Round 2014
| 
| align=center| 1
| align=center| 3:33
| Tokyo, Japan
| 
|-
| Win
| align=center| 10–4
| Tadaaki Yamamoto
| Decision (unanimous)
| Shooto: Gig Tokyo 15
| 
| align=center| 3
| align=center| 5:00
| Tokyo, Japan
| 
|-
| Loss
| align=center| 9–4
| Mikihito Yamagami
| Technical Submission (rear-naked choke)
| Shooto: 10th Round
| 
| align=center| 2
| align=center| 1:36
| Tokyo, Japan
| 
|-
| Win
| align=center| 9–3
| Yuki Shoujou
| Decision (majority)
| Shooto: 3rd Round
| 
| align=center| 3
| align=center| 5:00
| Tokyo, Japan
| 
|-
| Loss
| align=center| 8–3
| Junji Ikoma
| Decision (unanimous)
| Shooto: Shooto Tradition 2011
| 
| align=center| 3
| align=center| 5:00
| Tokyo, Japan
| 
|-
| Win
| align=center| 8–2
| Atsushi Takeuchi
| KO (punch)
| Shooto: The Rookie Tournament 2010 Final
| 
| align=center| 1
| align=center| 3:58
| Tokyo, Japan
| 
|-
| Win
| align=center| 7–2
| Jesse Taitano
| TKO (punches)
| Shooto: The Way of Shooto 5: Like a Tiger, Like a Dragon
| 
| align=center| 3
| align=center| 4:50
| Tokyo, Japan
| 
|-
| Win
| align=center| 6–2
| Hiroaki Yoshioka
| Decision (unanimous)
| Shooto: Shooting Disco 11: Tora Tora Tora!
| 
| align=center| 3
| align=center| 5:00
| Tokyo, Japan
| 
|-
| Win
| align=center| 5–2
| Takeshi Sato
| Decision (unanimous)
| Shooto: The Rookie Tournament 2009 Final
| 
| align=center| 2
| align=center| 5:00
| Tokyo, Japan
| 
|-
| Win
| align=center| 4–2
| Kenichi Sawada
| Submission (rear-naked choke)
| Shooto: Gig Tokyo 2
| 
| align=center| 2
| align=center| 0:47
| Tokyo, Japan
| 
|-
| Loss
| align=center| 3–2
| Mikihito Yamagami
| Submission (guillotine choke)
| Shooto: The Rookie Tournament 2008 Final
| 
| align=center| 2
| align=center| 2:15
| Tokyo, Japan
| 
|-
| Win
| align=center| 3–1
| Yoshitaka Aki
| TKO (punches)
| Shooto: Shooto Tradition 3
| 
| align=center| 1
| align=center| 4:01
| Tokyo, Japan
| 
|-
| Win
| align=center| 2–1
| Kazuyuki Yoshida
| TKO (punches)
| Shooto: Back To Our Roots 7
| 
| align=center| 1
| align=center| 1:52
| Tokyo, Japan
| 
|-
| Loss
| align=center| 1–1
| Noboru Tahara
| Decision (unanimous)
| Shooto: Shooting Disco 3: Everybody Fight Now
| 
| align=center| 2
| align=center| 5:00
| Tokyo, Japan
| 
|-
| Win
| align=center| 1–0
| Takahisa Toyoshima
| TKO (punches)
| Shooto: Back To Our Roots 4
| 
| align=center| 1
| align=center| 0:53
| Tokyo, Japan
|

See also
 List of Shooto champions
 List of male mixed martial artists

References

External links

Living people
Japanese male mixed martial artists
Strawweight mixed martial artists
Mixed martial artists utilizing shootfighting
1986 births
Sportspeople from Yokohama